Elbrus-2S+ is a multi-core microprocessor based on the Elbrus 2000 architecture developed by Moscow Center of SPARC Technologies (MCST). There are multiple reports regarding the evolution of this technology for the purpose of import substitution in Russia, which was raised by several ministries in July 2014, due to economic sanctions in response to 2014 pro-Russian unrest in Ukraine. In December 2014, it was announced that Mikron Group started pilot production of a dual-core variant of this microprocessor called Elbrus-2SM using a 90 nanometer CMOS manufacturing process in Zelenograd, Russia.

Technology
The Elbrus-4S CPU is reported to have built in support for Intel x86 emulation as well as a native VLIW mode where it can perform up to 23 instructions per clock cycle.
When programs are built for Elbrus 2000 native mode, the compiler determines how the different operations shall be distributed over the 23 computing units before saving the final program. This means that no dynamic scheduling is needed during runtime, thus reducing the amount of work the CPU has to perform every time a program is executed. Because static scheduling only needs to be performed one time when the program is built, more advanced algorithms for finding the optimal distribution of work can be employed.

Specifications

South Bridge

The south bridge for the Elbrus 2000 chipset, which connects peripherals and bus to the CPU is developed by MCST. It is also compatible with the MCST-R1000.

Applications
In December 2012, Kraftway announced that it will deliver an Elbrus based PC together with its partner MCST.

In August 2013, Kuyan, Gusev, Kozlov, Kaimuldenov and Kravtsunov from MCST has published an article based on their experience with building and deployment of Debian Linux for the Elbrus computer architecture. It was done using a hybrid compiler toolchain (cross and native), for Elbrus-2S+ and Intel Core 2 Duo.

In December 2014, an implementation of the OpenGL 3.3 standard was demonstrated by running the game Doom 3 BFG Edition on an Elbrus-4S, clocked at 720 MHz, using a Radeon graphics card with 2 gigabytes of video memory.

In April 2015, MCST announced two new products based on the Elbrus-4S CPU: One 19-inch rack server with four CPUs (16 cores) and one personal computer.

In December 2015, the first shipment of PCs based on VLIW CPU Elbrus-4s was made in Russia.

References

External links
 https://web.archive.org/web/20150317100907/http://www.mcst.ru/elbrus_2c_111101.shtml
 http://elbrus2k.wikidot.com/elbrus-2c

Very long instruction word computing
X86 microprocessors
VLIW microprocessors